Charif Souki (born 1953) is an American businessman. He is the co-founder and former CEO of Cheniere Energy, an oil and gas company which specialized in liquefied natural gas. He was the highest-paid chief executive officer in the United States in 2013.

Early life
Charif Souki was born in 1953 in Cairo, Egypt. His father, Samyr Souki, was a member of the Greek Orthodox Church. Souki moved to Beirut, Lebanon in 1957.

Career
Souki worked as a banker on Wall Street. He also worked as a restaurateur.

Souki served as the chief executive officer of Cheniere Energy until December 2015. He earned US$142 million in 2013, making him the highest-paid CEO in the United States that year. Souki claims he stepped down as CEO after a disagreement with board member Carl Icahn.

Souki is the co-founder of Tellurian Investments with Martin Houston.

References

Living people
1953 births
Egyptian emigrants to the United States
American people of Lebanese descent
American bankers
American restaurateurs
American company founders
American chief executives